Pöide is a village in Saaremaa Parish, Saare County, on the eastern part of Saaremaa Island, Estonia.

Before the administrative reform in 2017, the village was in Pöide Parish.

Politician Oskar Köster (1890–1941) was born in Pöide.

References 

Villages in Saare County
Castles of the Teutonic Knights
Kreis Ösel